Frank Marion Eddy (April 1, 1856 – January 13, 1929) was a United States representative from Minnesota's 7th congressional district.  Eddy was born in Pleasant Grove Township, Minnesota, before moving to Iowa in 1860 with his family.  They returned in 1863 to Olmsted County, Minnesota, and settled near Elmira. In 1867, they moved to Sauk Centre, Minnesota, where Eddy attended the common schools

Eddy taught school in a rural district before joining the Northern Pacific Railroad Company as a land examiner in 1881 and 1882.  He then moved to Glenwood, Minnesota, and served as clerk of the district court of Pope County  from 1884 to 1893.

In 1894, Eddy was elected as the first United States Representative from Minnesota who was a native of the state.  He was elected as a Republican to the 54th, 55th, 56th, and 57th congresses, March 4, 1895, until March 3, 1903.  While a congressman, Eddy served as chairman of the  Committee on Mines and Mining in the 57th congress.  He declined to be a candidate for renomination in 1902.

After his terms in Congress, Eddy became editor and owner of the Sauk Centre Herald. He died on January 13, 1929, in Saint Paul, Minnesota, and was interred in Greenwood Cemetery in Sauk Centre.

References

1856 births
1929 deaths
Republican Party members of the United States House of Representatives from Minnesota
People from Olmsted County, Minnesota
People from Glenwood, Minnesota
People from Sauk Centre, Minnesota